Korne may refer to:
 Korne, Chojnice County, a settlement in Chojnice County, Poland
 Korne, Kościerzyna County, a village in Kościerzyna County, Poland
 Radu Korne,  Romanian Brigadier General during World War II

See also
 Kornie, a village in Gmina Lubycza Królewska, Tomaszów Lubelski County, Lublin Voivodeship, Poland
 Korn (disambiguation)
 Corn (disambiguation)
 Corne (disambiguation)